Kepler-87c is a planet orbiting Kepler-87, a star slightly more massive than the Sun and nearing the end of its main-sequence period.

Characteristics
Despite being larger than Neptune, Kepler-87c is only about 6.4 times more massive than Earth. This means that its density is only 0.152 g/cm3. This is the first planet with a comparable mass to have such a low density. Its equilibrium temperature is 130 °C.

References

External links
 Beyond Earthly Skies - An Extremely Low Density Super-Earth

Exoplanets discovered in 2013
Transiting exoplanets
Exoplanets discovered by the Kepler space telescope

Cygnus (constellation)